The Gehry Residence is architect Frank Gehry's home. It was originally an extension, designed by Gehry and built around an existing Dutch colonial style house. It makes use of unconventional materials, such as chain-link fences and corrugated steel.  It is sometimes considered one of the earliest deconstructivist buildings, although Gehry denies this.

The residence is in Santa Monica, California. In 1977, Frank and Berta Gehry bought a pink bungalow originally built in 1920. Gehry wanted to experiment with the materials he was already using—metal, plywood, chain link fencing, and wood framing. In 1978, he chose to wrap the house with a new exterior while leaving the old exterior visible. He hardly touched the rear and south facades, and to the other sides of the house he added tilted glass cubes. Many of Gehry's neighbors were unhappy with the unusual architecture appearing in their neighborhood.

As of 2016, Gehry still owns the house. Though he has nearly finished building another residence overlooking Rustic Canyon, he plans to keep the Santa Monica house in the family.

References
 El Croquis 74/75 1995
 http://www.greatbuildings.com/buildings/Gehry_House.html
 Dal Co, Francesco and Forster, Kurt. W.  "Frank O. Gehry: The Complete Works."  Published in the United States of America in 1998 by The Monacelli Press, Inc.  Copyright 1998 by The Monacelli Press, Inc.

External links

Photographs of exterior of Gehry Residence

Frank Gehry buildings
Deconstructivism
Architecture in California
Houses in Los Angeles County, California
Buildings and structures in Santa Monica, California
1970s architecture in the United States